Charles McMillen may refer to:

Tom McMillen (Charles Thomas McMillen, born 1952), American politician
Charles McMillen (architect) (1854–1911), Irish-born American architect